Western Australian Charity Orchestra Inc (WACO) is a not-for-profit organisation dedicated to changing lives through music. Their current ensembles include a full symphony orchestra the West Coast Philharmonic, West Coast Philharmonic Chorus and the WA Wind Symphony - all based in Perth, Western Australia.  All ensembles are made up almost entirely of volunteers, and for many years the Western Australian Charity Orchestra produced concerts to help fund-raise for Western Australian charities. In 2017 WACO Inc became an Australian Registered charity in their own right, and now their volunteers work in the community to make a difference first-hand in the lives of others.

History 

The Western Australian Charity Orchestra was founded in 2008 by Samuel Parry, a music student at WAAPA. The organisation was formed to provide musicians with more opportunities to make a difference in the community by performing to fundraise for charities. From 2008-2016 the organisation held eight concert seasons, and in its 2016 season WACO raised $19,000 for Guide Dogs WA.

From 2008–2009 and 2013–2016, WACO produced an annual summer series featuring the Western Australian Charity Orchestra and Choir. In 2017 the organisation expanded into four full-time ensembles including an orchestra, wind symphony, chorale and youth concert band.

From 2015–2016 WACO ran the North Coast Youth Concert Band (NCYCB), a concert band created for high school students mainly for players from Perth's northern suburbs.

WACO is a not-for-profit incorporated organisation and an Australian Registered charity (2017-).

From 2017 onwards, WACO Inc. took a new direction in charity work. Now, their own volunteers work in the community to make a difference first-hand in the lives of others.

In February 2020 the Western Australian Charity Orchestra changed its name to the West Coast Philharmonic Orchestra, whilst retaining the WACO name for the incorporated organisation itself.

The orchestra's home is the newly built and fully equipped Churchlands Concert Hall at Churchlands Senior High School. They also regularly perform in the Perth Concert Hall. WACO's ensembles are conducted by founder and music director Samuel Parry.

References

External links 
 Official website

Australian orchestras
Culture in Perth, Western Australia